Wolfgang Justin Mommsen (5 November 1930 – 11 August 2004) was a German historian. He was the twin brother of historian Hans Mommsen.

Biography
Wolfgang Mommsen was born in Marburg, the son of the historian Wilhelm Mommsen and great-grandson of the Roman historian Theodor Mommsen. He was educated at the University of Marburg, the University of Cologne, and the University of Leeds between 1951 and 1959. He was assistant professor at the University of Cologne (1959–1967) and full professor University of Düsseldorf (1967–1996); he directed the German Historical Institute in London between 1978 and 1985. In 1965, he married Sabine von Schalburg, with whom he had four children.

Mommsen wrote a biography of Max Weber in 1958. His dissertation, on Max Weber and German politics, published in English in 1984, revolutionized the "understanding of the 20th century's most influential sociologist by setting him firmly in the context of his times, and showing him to be a liberal nationalist and imperialist, much to the horror of many of his admirers. He went on to demonstrate that a knowledge of Weber's political thought and action was essential if one were to grasp accurately his theory of power. This was an outstanding achievement, and Wolfgang followed it up by playing a leading role in editing a new, comprehensive edition of Weber's works.... The Mommsens were related to Weber by marriage, so there was something particularly iconoclastic in Wolfgang's book, which caused a huge storm when it first appeared." His main area of expertise was 19th- and 20th-century British and German history. His interests were wide-ranging and he wrote about diplomatic, social, intellectual, and economic history. Mommsen championed a Sonderweg ("special path") interpretation of German history. Echoing the views of Hans-Ulrich Wehler and Fritz Fischer, he argued that 19th-century Germany was only partially modernized, as economic modernization was not accompanied by political modernization. Much of Mommsen's comparative studies of British and German history concerns why, in his view, the British had both a political and economic modernization, but the Germans had only the latter. An Anglophile, Mommsen greatly enjoyed teaching and living in the United Kingdom.

In Mommsen's view, the foreign policy of the German Empire was driven by domestic concerns, as the German elite sought distractions abroad to hold off demands for democracy at home. For Mommsen, the major responsibility for the outbreak of the First World War rested on Germany's shoulders. Furthermore, the November Revolution of 1918 did not go far enough and allowed the pre-1918 elite to continue to dominate German life, thus leading inevitably to Nazi Germany. Mommsen has written books condemning appeasement.

In the Historikerstreit ("historians' dispute"), Mommsen took the position that the Holocaust was a uniquely-evil event and should not be compared to the Stalinist Terror in the Soviet Union.

In 1998, several younger German historians criticized Mommsen for not denouncing the Nazi past of his mentors as a university student in the 1950s.

See also
Interpretations of Weber's liberalism

Work
Max Weber und die deutsche Politik, 1890–1920, 1959.
"The Debate on German War Aims" pages 47–74 from Journal of Contemporary History, Volume 1, 1966.
"Die latente Krise des Deutschen Reiches, 1909–1914" from Handbuch der deutschen Geschichte, Volume 4: Deutsche Geschichte der neuesten Zeit von Bismarcks Entlassung bis zur Gegenwart, 1973.
The Age of Bureaucracy: Perspectives on the Political Sociology of Max Weber, 1974.
"Society and War: Two New Analyses of the First World War," Journal of Modern History  Vol. 47, No. 3, September 1975,  
Imperialismustheorien, 1977.
Der europäische Imperialismus. Aufsätze und Abhandlungen, 1979.
The Emergence of the Welfare State in Britain and Germany, 1850–1950, co-edited with Wolfgang Mock, 1981.
Sozialprotest, Gewalt, Terror: Gewaltanwendung durch politische und gesellschaftliche Randgruppen im 19. und 20. Jahrhundert, co-edited with Gerhard Hirschfeld, 1982.
The Fascist Challenge and the Policy of Appeasement, co-edited with Lothar Kettenacker, 1983.
The Development of Trade Unionism in Great Britain and Germany, 1880–1914, co-edited with Hans-Gerhard Husung, 1985.
Imperialism and After: Continuities and Discontinuities co-edited with Jürgen Osterhammel, 1986.
Bismarck, Europe, and Africa: The Berlin Africa Conference, 1884–1885, and the Onset of Partition, co-edited with Stig Förster and Ronald Robinson, 1988.
The Political and Social Theory of Max Weber: Collected Essays, 1989.
“Neither Denial nor Forgetfulness Will Free Us From the Past: Harmonizing Our Understanding of History Endangers Freedom” pages 202–215 from Forever In The Shadow Of Hitler? edited by Ernst Piper, Atlantic Highlands, N.J.: Humanities Press, 1993.
Intellektuelle im Deutschen Kaiserreich, co-edited with Gangolf Hubinger, 1993.
Der Autoritäre Nationalstaat, 1990 translated by Richard Deveson into English as Imperial Germany 1867–1918: Politics, culture, and society in an authoritarian state, 1995.
"Max Weber and the Regeneration of Russia," Journal of Modern History Vol. 69, No. 1, March 1997.

References

Sources

External links
Obituary Wolfgang Mommsen by Richard J. Evans
Versailles Treaty-From The German POV
German Army's Advance into Belgium

1930 births
2004 deaths
20th-century German historians
Academics of the German Historical Institute London
German male non-fiction writers
Historians of Nazism
Historians of World War I
Historians of World War II
People from Hesse-Nassau
People from Marburg
University of Cologne alumni
Academic staff of the University of Cologne
Academic staff of Heinrich Heine University Düsseldorf
University of Marburg alumni